The following notable old boys of Eton College were born in the 15th, 16th and 17th centuries.

15th century
 Thomas Rotherham (1423–1500), Keeper of the Privy Seal, 1467–1474, Bishop of Rochester, 1468–1472, Bishop of Lincoln, 1472–1480, Lord Chancellor, 1474–1483, and Archbishop of York, 1480–1500
 Oliver King (c.1432–1503), Bishop of Exeter, 1492–1495, and Bishop of Bath and Wells, 1495–1503
 John Doget (c.1434–1501), humanist scholar
 Robert Wydow (c.1446–1505), poet and church musician
 Walter Lambe (c.1450-c.1504), composer and church musician
 John Browne (1453-c.1500) composer
 Robert Hacomblen (c.1455-1528) classical scholar and composer, Provost of King's College, Cambridge
 John Barker (fl. c.1471–1482), logician
 Nicholas West (c.1461–1533), Bishop of Ely, 1535–1538, and diplomat
 John Kite (died 1537), Archbishop of Armagh, 1513–1521, and Bishop of Carlisle, 1521–1537
 Richard Croke (or Crocus) (c.1489–1558), classical scholar
 Edward Fox (c.1496–1538), Bishop of Hereford, 1535–1538

16th century
 John Frith (1503–1533), Protestant clergyman and martyr
 Sir Thomas Pope (1507–1558), founder of Trinity College, Oxford
 Edward Aglionby (1520–c.1587), poet
 Thomas Tusser (1524–1580), poet and farmer
 Robert Glover (died 1555), Protestant martyr
 Laurence Saunders (died 1555), Protestant preacher and martyr
 Sir Thomas Sutton (c.1532–1611), founder of Charterhouse School
 Sir Humphrey Gilbert (c.1539–1583), coloniser of Newfoundland
 Ralph Sherwin (1550–1581), Jesuit priest, martyr and Catholic saint
 Thomas Aufield (1552–1585), Roman Catholic priest and beatified martyr
 John Cowell (1554–1611), Regius Professor of Civil Law, University of Cambridge, 1594–1611
 Sir John Harington (1561–1612), author and inventor of the water closet
 Sir Thomas Posthumous Hoby (1566–1640), Member of Parliament, claimed as the inspiration for Malvolio in Twelfth Night.
 William Oughtred (1575–1660), mathematician
 Robert Devereux, 3rd Earl of Essex (1591–1646), General, Parliamentarian Army, 1642–1645
 Méric Casaubon (1599–1671), classical scholar

17th century
Henry Hammond (1605–1660), clergyman
Bulstrode Whitelocke (1605–1675), lawyer and politician, prominent Parliamentarian during the Civil War
 Edmund Waller (1606–1687), poet and anti-Parliamentarian conspirator
 John Pearson (1613–1686), Lady Margaret's Professor of Divinity, University of Cambridge, 1661–1672, and Bishop of Chester, 1673–1686
 Henry More (1614–1687), theologian and philosopher
 George Fane (c.1616–1663), Royalist commander
 Antony Ascham (died 1650), Parliamentarian Ambassador to Spain, 1650, and murder victim
 Robert Boyle (1627–1691), natural philosopher and chemist
 Henry Godolphin (1648–1733), Provost of Eton, 1695–1707, 1726–1733, and Dean of St Paul's, 1707–1726
 George Stanhope (1660–1728), Dean of Canterbury, 1704–1728
 John Rosewell Headmaster (1671–1682)
 James Stanhope, 1st Earl Stanhope (1673–1721), Secretary of State for the Southern Department, 1714–1717, 1718–1721, Chancellor of the Exchequer, 1717–1718, and soldier
 Charles Townshend, 2nd Viscount Townshend (1674–1738), Secretary of State for the Northern Department, 1714–1717, 1721–1730
 Anthony Collins (1676–1729), deist
 Robert Walpole, 1st Earl of Orford (1676–1745), Secretary at War, 1708–1710, Prime Minister and Chancellor of the Exchequer, 1721–1742
 John Weldon (1676–1736), organist and composer
 Henry St John, 1st Viscount Bolingbroke (1678–1751), Secretary at War, 1704–1708
 Charles Talbot, 1st Baron Talbot of Hensol (1685–1737), Solicitor General, 1726–1733, and Lord Chancellor, 1733–1737
 Sir William Wyndham (1687–1740), Secretary at War, 1712–1713, and Chancellor of the Exchequer, 1713–1714
 Thomas Thackeray, 1693–1760, an 18th century Head Master of Harrow
 William George (c.1698 - 1756) Dean of Lincoln, Provost of King's College, Cambridge, Head Master of Eton

See also
 List of Old Etonians born in the 18th century
 List of Old Etonians born in the 19th century
 List of Old Etonians born in the 20th century

References

 
Lists of people associated with Eton College